= Bangrasia =

- village
- Location within Madhya Pradesh Location within India
- Coordinates: 23.139733°N 77.533055°E
- Country: India
- State: Madhya Pradesh
- District: Bhopal
- Tehsil: Huzur

Population (2011)
  - Total: 4,946
- Time zone: UTC+5:30 (IST)
- ISO 3166 code: IN-MP
- Census code: 482558

Bangrasia is a village in the Bhopal district of Madhya Pradesh, India. It is located in the Huzur tehsil and the Phanda block.

In 2011, the Government of Madhya Pradesh identified this village as the site of a proposed film studio complex.

== Demographics ==
According to the 2011 census of India, Bangrasia has 1221 households. The effective literacy rate (i.e. the literacy rate of population excluding children aged 6 and below) is 87.58%.

Demographics (2011 Census)
| | Total | Male | Female |
|---|---|---|---|
| Population | 4946 | 2549 | 2397 |
| Children aged below 6 years | 790 | 421 | 369 |
| Scheduled caste | 460 | 245 | 215 |
| Scheduled tribe | 163 | 78 | 85 |
| Literates | 1000 | 500 | 500 |
| Workers (all) | 1481 | 1163 | 318 |
| Main workers (total) | 1273 | 1083 | 190 |
| Main workers: Cultivators | 94 | 57 | 37 |
| Main workers: Agricultural labourers | 92 | 74 | 18 |
| Main workers: Household industry workers | 137 | 116 | 21 |
| Main workers: Other | 950 | 836 | 114 |
| Marginal workers (total) | 208 | 80 | 128 |
| Marginal workers: Cultivators | 27 | 10 | 17 |
| Marginal workers: Agricultural labourers | 64 | 17 | 47 |
| Marginal workers: Household industry workers | 38 | 23 | 15 |
| Marginal workers: Others | 79 | 30 | 49 |
| Non-workers | 3465 | 1386 | 2079 |
